Kalla Malla Sulla is a 2011 multi-starrer Kannada film in the comedy genre starring V. Ravichandran, Ramesh Aravind, Vijay Raghavendra in the lead roles. The film has been directed and written by Udhaya Prakash and produced by K. Manju. Alex Paul has composed the music. This is a remake of the successful 2002 Tamil film Charlie Chaplin.

Cast
 V. Ravichandran as Ravi
 Ramesh Aravind as Ramesh
 Vijay Raghavendra as Raghu
 Ragini Dwivedi as Khushbu
 Yagna Shetty as Ramya
 Rishika Singh as Sanjana
 Rangayana Raghu
 Monica
 Mandya Ramesh
 Sihi Kahi Chandru
 Sadhu Kokila

Soundtrack

Reception

Critical response 

A critic from The New Indian Express wrote "Among the heroes, it is Ramesh Aravind who steals the show with his sterling performance. His gestures when he lands at the wrong place at an equally wrong time and attempts to come out of such situations are hilarious. Vijaya Rahavendra has also acted well". B S Srivani from Deccan Herald wrote "Alex Paul catches the ears with three songs while GSV Seetharam’s camera captures both the locations and Ragini’s figure in all their glory. Kalla Malla Sulla is pure timepass". A critic from The Times of India scored the film at 3.5 out of 5 stars and says "Ramesh steals the show with his brilliant performance. Ravichandran and Vijaya Raghavendra excel. Ragini wins your heart with her beauty and expressions. Rishika Singh impresses. Monica and Yagna Shetty have done justice to their roles. Music by Alex Paul and cinematography by G S V Seetharam are good". Sunayana Suresh from DNA wrote "This film is worth a one-time watch with the family. Just ensure you close your kids’ eyes during two songs. You’ll know which ones they are". A critic from Bangalore Mirror wrote  "Also at the end, it is shown that the ‘wronged wives’ have learnt a lesson or two. Too much of male chauvinism? We think so.After a drab first half, the film picks up pace  later on. Then there is non-stop laugh-a-minute sequences till the end".

References

2011 films
2010s Kannada-language films
Kannada remakes of Tamil films
Indian comedy films